Liliana Betti  (1937 – 19 August 1998) was an Italian screenwriter and director. She was sometimes credited as Liliane Betti.

Born in Nigoline, Province of Brescia, Betti in 1957 moved to Rome, where she became a real-life friend of Federico Fellini. Fellini referred to her as "her boss" and as "the little goddess of ideas", and Betti was a collaborator, a casting director, a script supervisor and a second unit director for many of his films until 1980. As a screenwriter, she also often collaborated with Marco Ferreri and Enrico Oldoini. In 1991 she was nominated at the David di Donatello Award for best screenplay for Ferreri's The House of Smiles.

References

Further reading

External links 
 

1937 births
1998 deaths
20th-century Italian screenwriters
Mass media people from the Province of Brescia
Italian women screenwriters
Italian women film directors
20th-century women writers
20th-century Italian women